Brian A. Keselowski (born September 2, 1981) is an American professional stock car racing driver, crew chief, and spotter. He made headlines in 2011, qualifying his family-owned K-Automotive Motorsports entry into the Daytona 500.

Early life and family
Born in Rochester Hills, Michigan in 1981, Brian Keselowski is the older brother of 2012 NASCAR Sprint Cup Series champion Brad Keselowski, and the son and nephew of former drivers Bob and Ron Keselowski, respectively.

He graduated from Rochester High School in 1999, taking night classes to allow him to work as a jackman for the family racing team, K-Automotive Motorsports; he flew to the racetrack directly from his senior prom to assist in competition. He began his racing career competing in super late model events, winning rookie-of-the-year at Auto City Speedway in 2000.

Early career
Keselowski made his stock car debut in the ARCA RE/MAX Series in 2004. He made six starts that season, driving the No. 29 Competition Graphics Dodge for Bob Ducharme. He had three top-tens, including a ninth-place run in his debut at Kentucky Speedway, and finished 34th in points. The next season, the team was purchased by his family, and he ran seven races including a string of five consecutive top-ten finishes. In 2006, Holloway Motorsports and Dusty's Collision became the sponsors of his car, and he won his first race at Berlin Raceway. Keselowski also made his NASCAR Busch Series (later renamed the NASCAR Nationwide Series) debut that year at Phoenix in the No. 23 Ridley Motorcycles Chevrolet for Keith Coleman Racing, starting and finishing in 43rd place. He had intended to compete at Auto Club Speedway in Fontana, California, but was not approved to run at the  track; his brother Brad drove the race instead, jump-starting his career.

In 2007, he ran a career-high 12 races in the ARCA RE/MAX Series, splitting time with his family team and the No. 5 Lucas Oil Pontiac for Bobby Gerhart. He won twice and finished 22nd in points. In the Busch Series, he made four starts in the Nos. 19 and 49, including his first top ten finish at Memphis Motorsports Park. The next season, he made 11 starts, beginning in the No. 28 Jay Robinson Racing Chevy for four races before moving to his family's No. 92, co-owned with Dusty Whitney, with a best finish of 15th at ORP, four spots ahead of his brother.

For 2009, Keselowski attempted his first full-time season for Whitney and K-Automotive Motorsports, which renumbered its car with the No. 26. The primary sponsor for Keselowski's car during the 2009 CarQuest Auto Parts 300 was the Detroit Red Wings National Hockey League team; Keselowski ran eighteen races, but stepped aside for twelve of the final fifteen events to act as crew chief while other drivers competed in the car. During the 2010 season, he qualified for 26 of 35 events; he finished 11th in the season-opening event at Daytona, but had an average finish overall for the season of 34th.

2010–2012
During the 2010 season, Keselowski attempted to qualify for three NASCAR Sprint Cup Series races, starting with the August race at Bristol Motor Speedway, although he failed to qualify for any of these events. In early 2011, Keselowski declared his intention to compete for the 2011 NASCAR Sprint Cup Series Rookie Of The Year title; he was the only driver to do so as of the start of Speedweeks at Daytona International Speedway, however Andy Lally stated his intention to run for the award while Speedweeks was underway. The decision to move up to the Cup Series was made on economic grounds; the costs of competing in the Nationwide Series were deemed to be comparable to a Sprint Cup effort.

In qualifying for the 2011 Daytona 500, Keselowski posted the slowest time of the 48 cars that attempted to qualify, requiring that he finish in the top two of non-qualified cars in the second Gatorade Duel to secure a position in the race. With a little help from brother Brad, Keselowski finished 5th in the second Gatorade Duel and started 12th in the 2011 Daytona 500.

Shortly after Keselowski's surprise finish in the Duels, he received help from a number of sources, including tires from Evernham Motorsports and an engine from Penske Racing. The engine Penske offered could not be fitted into the car in time. In addition, the K-Automotive Motorsports team received sponsorship from Discount Tire. Keselowski ran as high as fourth, but was involved in a wreck on lap 29, finishing 41st. Keselowski failed to qualify for the next two races.

In March 2011, Keselowski had severe abdominal pain and needed gallbladder surgery; Dennis Setzer filled in for races at Bristol, where he finished 38th, and Martinsville, where the team withdrew after a practice crash. Keselowski returned to the No. 92 team for races at Richmond and Darlington in May, but failed to qualify for either race. Following further time off for reevaluation of his underfunded race team, K-Automotive switched to Chevrolet for Michigan and received a one-race sponsorship deal with Melling Auto Parts, but failed to qualify for the race; Setzer attempted to qualify at New Hampshire and the fall Martinsville race but failed to qualify. Scott Riggs also attempted Homestead but did not qualify as well.

For 2012, the team competed in two events in the ARCA Racing Series; teaming with Sinica Motorsports to field the No. 94 for Keselowski in the ARCA event at Mobile International Speedway, and also competing at Berlin Raceway, where Keselowski posted his best finish of the season, 23rd.

2013

In 2013, Keselowski announced his intention to compete in the Daytona 500 with Hamilton Means Racing. Keselowski did not have a great qualifying run, which made him start poorly in the Budweiser Duel. Keselowski started the Budweiser Duel 23rd, but failed to make the race, with a finish in the Duel of 21st. He returned to the Sprint Cup Series at Richmond at the end of April. He started the Sprint Showdown on May 18, qualifying 23rd and finishing 19th (four laps down) in a field of 23 cars.

2014
In January 2014, Keselowski announced that he would be returning to running the No. 92 for his own team, Brian Keselowski Motorsports in the 2014 season, running a Ford Fusion.  Ultimately, though, the team never attempted a race.

2015
On October 15, 2015, Keselowski's brother Brad announced that Brian would drive the No. 29 Brad Keselowski Racing in the Camping World Truck Series at Talladega Superspeedway as a replacement driver for Austin Theriault, who had been injured earlier in the season. He ran upfront for a portion of the race and led 10 laps but would ultimately finish 17th after running out of fuel during a green-white-checkered finish.

Crew chiefing
After stepping away from the drivers seat, Brian Keselowski began to work as a crew chief, working with Stefan Parsons in the late model racing ranks in 2016 before eventually joining NASCAR Camping World Truck Series team Premium Motorsports to work on the organization's No. 49 entry. Keselowski and several other employees were dismissed from Premium when they refused to work on NY Racing Team equipment in the Premium shop in May 2018. Later that year, he joined NASCAR Xfinity Series team MBM Motorsports to become Chad Finchum's crew chief. After approximately a year with MBM, Keselowski left the team.

Motorsports career results

NASCAR
(key) (Bold – Pole position awarded by qualifying time. Italics – Pole position earned by points standings or practice time. * – Most laps led.)

Sprint Cup Series

Daytona 500

Nationwide Series

Camping World Truck Series

ARCA Racing Series
(key) (Bold – Pole position awarded by qualifying time. Italics – Pole position earned by points standings or practice time. * – Most laps led.)

 Season still in progress
 Ineligible for series points

References

External links
 
 
 

Living people
1981 births
People from Rochester Hills, Michigan
Racing drivers from Detroit
Racing drivers from Michigan
NASCAR drivers
ARCA Menards Series drivers
American people of Polish descent
Keselowski family
NASCAR crew chiefs